Bayonne Decree (April 17, 1808) was one of the Napoleonic decrees which ordered all American private ships arriving in Europe to be considered as illicitly coming from British ports, in violation of the embargo and in Britain's service.<

References 

Napoleonic Wars
Decrees
April 1808 events